Jeffrey Hammond (born 30 July 1946), often known by his former stage name Jeffrey Hammond-Hammond, is an artist and retired musician best known for being the bassist of progressive rock band Jethro Tull from 1971 to 1975. With Jethro Tull, Hammond played on some of the band's most successful and well-known albums, including Aqualung (1971) and Thick as a Brick (1972).

Hammond adopted the name "Hammond-Hammond" as a joke, since both his father's surname and mother's maiden name were the same. He also joked in interviews that his mother defiantly chose to keep her maiden name, just like Eleanor Roosevelt.

Musician with Jethro Tull
One of several band members of Jethro Tull to originate from Blackpool, England, Hammond met the band's leader Ian Anderson in school when he was 17 years old, eventually joining a band with him and future band members John Evan and Barriemore Barlow. After leaving grammar school Hammond opted to study painting rather than continue with music, but was convinced to join Jethro Tull in January 1971. Before joining the band as a performer, he appears to have spent much time with the band in the background. Anderson wrote songs about his friend's idiosyncrasies, of which the best known are "A Song for Jeffrey" (on the album This Was), "Jeffrey Goes to Leicester Square" (Stand Up) and "For Michael Collins, Jeffrey and Me" (Benefit). Hammond is also mentioned in the lyrics of the Benefit track "Inside".

Hammond is credited with naming the "claghorn", a hybrid instrument. Ian Anderson took the mouthpiece from a saxophone and bell of a toy trumpet and attached them to the body of a bamboo flute. The result can be heard on the track "Dharma for One" on the album This Was. According to Anderson, "clag" was a term Hammond used for feces, "so 'claghorn' presumably because it sounded shit!"

During the time of Jethro Tull's dramatic stage costumes, Hammond began to wear a black-and-white-striped suit and played a matching bass guitar; this became his trademark and a feature of the group's Thick as a Brick stage performance. He narrated the surreal piece "The Story of the Hare Who Lost His Spectacles" on the album A Passion Play, and the related short film. He also received credit, along with Anderson and John Evan, for writing the piece.

Hammond burned the suit in December 1975 upon his departure from the band. According to Ian Anderson's sleevenotes for the 2002 reissue of Tull's Minstrel in the Gallery, Hammond "returned to his first love, painting, and put down his bass guitar, never to play again." His replacement as bass player was John Glascock, a professional musician.

Later appearances
Hammond made one attempt to rejoin Jethro Tull in the mid-1980s, as told by Ian Anderson during Alan Freeman's Friday Rock Show in March 1988, while providing comments for the broadcast of Tull's show at Hammersmith Odeon which Capital Radio was airing. According to Anderson, "Jeffrey was almost about to re-join the band", but despite one audition being made with the band, the bass player declared himself unable to play the rather difficult music of Jethro Tull and decided to give up.

Hammond attended Jethro Tull's 25th anniversary reunion party in 1994. He participated in an interview, along with Ian Anderson and Martin Barre, that was featured as a bonus track on the 1997 reissue of Thick as a Brick.

Discography
 Aqualung (1971)
 Thick as a Brick (1972)
 Living in the Past (compilation, 1972)
 A Passion Play (1973)
 War Child (1974)
 Minstrel in the Gallery (1975)

References

External links
 Official biography of Jeffrey Hammond on Jethro Tull website: JethroTull.com

1946 births
Living people
English rock bass guitarists
Male bass guitarists
Jethro Tull (band) members
People from Blackpool
Progressive rock bass guitarists